Actingclassof1977.com, or Acting Class of 1977, is a 2008 Australian documentary television film that looks at the Australian entertainment industry and the actor-training practices of the National Institute of Dramatic Art during the 1970s.  Written, directed and produced by Sally McKenzie, the documentary first aired on the ABC in June 2008.

Film
The documentary covers the experiences of acting students attending the National Institute of Dramatic Art in Sydney, Australia between the years 1975 to 1977.  The narrative structure of this film is unique in that it is framed as though the viewer is accessing a website. One of the students, filmmaker Sally McKenzie clicks through a series of webpages to uncover memories of 10 students and their 3 years of training. The film contains interviews of Steve Bisley, Annie Byron, John Francis, Mel Gibson, Debra Lawrance, Sally McKenzie, Linda Newton, Aubrey Mellor, and Monroe Reimers. Though referenced in the film through interviews of others students, Judy Davis declined to be interviewed for the documentary.

Reception
The Australian wrote that writer/director Sally McKenzie created a "witty new documentary" that is a "droll look at the nature of actors, what it's like to become one and the toll that their careers take. It's about survival and the terrible regret that accompanies those highly trained performers who don't make it and how their sadness never goes away." They further noted that students of the National Institute of Dramatic Art in 1977 worked out of "old tin sheds" at a former military camp in Sydney, and produced some "leading lights of film, television and theatre", but that not all from the 1977 group became stars.  They noted that the film showed teachers "were contradictory and sometimes seemed to be as much in the dark about acting as their students."  The courses offered tended to be psychoanalytic in teaching students how to bear up under "the industry's tendency to humiliate and degrade actors," but McKenzie revealed that nothing in their training "prepared them for the callousness of the marketplace, where appearance was everything."

Sydney Morning Herald wrote that none of the class of 1977 students interviewed for the project thought that Gibson or Davis would be as successful as they have been. "Theatre was very much the focus of our training," McKenzie said, "The thought of people being stars [in film and television] or having stellar careers was not really considered."

References

External links
 
 

Australian documentary films
2008 films
2008 documentary films